You're Only Young Twice is a British television comedy aired in 1971. It was produced by Associated Television (ATV). Cast included Liam Redmond, Adrienne Corri, Peter Copley, George Woodbridge, Leslie Dwyer, Vic Wise, Carmen Munroe, Anthony Jackson, Walter Swash, and John Dolan. All six episodes are believed to have been lost. It should not be confused with the 1977-1981 series of the same name, which still exists in the archives.

References

External links

1971 British television series debuts
1971 British television series endings
Lost television shows
English-language television shows
ITV sitcoms
1970s British sitcoms
Television shows produced by Associated Television (ATV)